David Holt  CB (29 October 1943 – 15 November 2022) was a British statistician who was Professor Emeritus of Social Statistics at the University of Southampton. He had been the president of the Royal Statistical Society (2005–2007), the last director of the Central Statistical Office of the United Kingdom, and the first director of the Office for National Statistics (and ex-officio Registrar General).

Background
Holt took a maths degree and a PhD in statistics at Exeter with thesis titled Some contributions to the statistical analysis of single and mixed exponential distributions in 1970. Throughout his career, his main interests have been survey methods, sampling theory and official statistics. He took a particular interest, through his membership of the Royal Statistical Society, in the independence of national statistics from government.

Career
Holt's first job was with Statistics Canada, the national statistics office of Canada, where he spent four years before joining the Department of Social Statistics at the University of Southampton in 1980. He was Leverhulme Professor of Social Statistics from 1980 to 1995 and Deputy Vice-Chancellor from 1990 to 1995. From 1989 to 1991, he was also vice-president of the International Association of Survey Statisticians (IASS).

Holt became the Director of the Central Statistical Office and Head of the Government Statistical Service in 1995 and, subsequently, the first Director of the Office for National Statistics when it was formed on 1 April 1996 from the merger of the Central Statistical Office (CSO) and the Office of Population Censuses and Surveys (OPCS). He was President of the Labour Statistics Congress (ILO) in 1997 and vice-chair of the United Nations Statistical Commission from 1998 to 1999.

Holt returned to the Department of Social Statistics at Southampton in 2000, working part-time as Professor of Social Statistics. He carried out consultancy work for the United Nations, the International Monetary Fund and the World Bank and was elected president of the Royal Statistical Society in 2005.

Awards and honours
In 1990 he was elected as a Fellow of the American Statistical Association.

Holt was appointed a Companion of the Order of the Bath (CB) in the 2000 New Year Honours. He was also the 2003 recipient of the Waksberg Prize in survey methodology.

Personal life and death
Holt died on 15 November 2022, at the age of 79.

References

"Professor Tim Holt: Career", Museum of Learning. Retrieved 20 May 2010.
Tim Holt, Julian Champkin (2007). "Tim Holt", Significance, vol 4 issue 2, pp 75–76.

1943 births
2022 deaths
Directors of the Central Statistical Office (United Kingdom)
Registrars-General for England and Wales
Directors of the Office for National Statistics
Presidents of the Royal Statistical Society
Survey methodologists
Academics of the University of Southampton
British social scientists
20th-century British mathematicians
21st-century British mathematicians
Fellows of the American Statistical Association
Companions of the Order of the Bath